Freemake Video Converter is a freemium entry-level video editing app (in spite of its name) developed by Ellora Assets Corporation. The program can be used to convert between video formats, rip video DVDs, create photo slideshows and music visualizations. It can also burn compatible video streams to DVD or Blu-ray Discs or upload them directly to YouTube.

Features 
Freemake Video Converter is an entry-level video editing app. It can perform simple non-linear video editing tasks, such as cutting, rotating, flipping, and combining multiple videos into one file with transition effects. It can also create photo slideshows with background music. Users are then able to upload these videos to YouTube.

Freemake Video Converter can read the majority of video, audio, and image formats, and outputs to AVI, MP4, WMV, Matroska, FLV, SWF, 3GP, DVD, Blu-ray, MPEG and MP3. The program also prepares videos supported by various multimedia devices, including Apple devices (iPod, iPhone, iPad), Xbox, Sony PlayStation, and Samsung, Nokia, BlackBerry, and Android mobile devices. The software is able to perform DVD burning and is able to convert videos, photographs, and music into DVD video.

The user interface is based on Windows Presentation Foundation technology. Freemake Video Converter supports NVIDIA CUDA technology for H.264 video encoding (starting with version 1.2.0).

Important updates 
Freemake Video Converter 2.0 was a major update which integrated two new functions: ripping video from online portals and Blu-ray Disc creation and burning. Version 2.1 implemented suggestions from users, including support for subtitles, ISO image creation, and DVD to DVD/Blu-ray conversion. With version 2.3 (earlier 2.2 Beta), support for DXVA has been added to accelerate conversion (up to 50% for HD content).

Version 3.0 added HTML5 video creation support and new presets for smartphones.

Version 4.0 (introduced in April 2013) added a freemium "Gold Pack" of extra features that can be added if a "donation" is paid. Starting with version 4.0.4, released on 27 August 2013, the program adds a promotional watermark at the end of every video longer than 5 minutes unless Gold Pack is activated. Version 4.1.9, released on 25 November 2015 added support to Drag & Drop functions which was not available on prior versions.

Since at least version 4.1.9.44 (1 May 2017), the Freemake Welcome Screen is added in the beginning of video and the big Freemake Logo is watermarked in the center of the whole video. This makes the free outputs useless and users are forced to pay money or stop using it. Version 4.1.9.31 (11 August 2016) does not have this restriction.

Licensing issues 
FFmpeg has added Freemake Video Converter v1.3 to its Hall of Shame. An issue tracker entry for this product, opened on 16 December 2010, says it is in violation of GNU General Public License as it is distributing components of FFmpeg project without including due credit. Ellora Assets Corporation has not responded yet.

Bundled software from sponsors 
Since version 4.0, Freemake Video Converter's installer includes a potentially unwanted search toolbar from Conduit as well as SweetPacks malware. Although users can decline the software during install, the opt-out option is rendered in gray which could mistakenly give the impression that it's disabled.

See also 
Related software
 Freemake Audio Converter
 Freemake Music Box
 Freemake Video Downloader

Comparison
 Comparison of video converters
 Comparison of video editing software

References

External links 
 

2010 software
Video conversion software
Windows-only freeware
Video editing software